The Intel 8257 is a direct memory access (DMA) controller, a part of the MCS 85 microprocessor family. The chip is supplied in 40-pin DIP package.

External links 
 Intel: 8257/8257-5 Programmable DMA Controller (PDF; 2,2 MB).
 NEC Electronics (Europe) GmbH, 1982 Catalog, p. 665–674 (μPD8257; μPD8257C-5).

Intel chipsets
Input/output integrated circuits